The tunica albuginea is the fibrous tissue covering of the testis. It is a dense blue-grey membrane, composed of bundles of white fibrous connective tissue, from which it derives its name albuginea, which interlace in every direction.

Structure 
The tunica albuginea is a layer of fibrous tissue capsule covering the testis. It is covered by the tunica vaginalis, except at the points of attachment of the epididymis to the testis, and along its posterior border, where the spermatic vessels enter the gland. It is thicker than the tunica albuginea of the ovary.

The tunica albuginea is applied to the tunica vasculosa over the glandular substance of the testis, and, at its posterior border, is reflected into the interior of the gland, forming an incomplete vertical septum, called the mediastinum testis (corpus Highmori).

Additional images

References

External links
  - "Inguinal Region, Scrotum and Testes: The Cross-Section of the Testis"
 

Scrotum